The 53rd New Zealand Parliament is the current meeting of Parliament in New Zealand. It opened on 25 November 2020 following the 17 October 2020 general election, and will expire on or before 20 November 2023 to trigger the next election. It consists of 120 members of Parliament (MPs) with five parties represented: the Labour and Green parties, in government, and the National, Māori and ACT parties, in opposition. The Sixth Labour Government has a majority in this Parliament. Jacinda Ardern continued as prime minister until her resignation on 25 January 2022; she was succeeded by Chris Hipkins.

The Parliament was elected using a mixed-member proportional representation (MMP) voting system. MPs represented 72 geographical electorates: 16 in the South Island, 49 in the North Island and 7 Māori electorates. This was an increase of one electorate seat from the previous election, as a result of population growth in the North Island. The remaining MPs were elected from party lists using the Webster/Sainte-Laguë method to realise proportionality.

Background

Electorate changes 

To achieve proportionality across electorates, there were a number of changes required to electorates based on population data determined through the 2018 census and projected population growth. As such, the number of geographical electorates increased by one compared to the 2017 election to account for the North Island's higher population growth, creating Takanini, and 30 general electorates and five Māori electorates had their boundaries adjusted so that each electorate contains roughly the same number of people.

2020 general election 

The 2020 general election was held on 17 October, after being delayed from 19 September due to a resurgence of COVID-19 cases during the COVID-19 pandemic in New Zealand. The dissolution of the 52nd Parliament was originally set for 12 August, and was delayed first to 17 August and finally to 6 September 2020.

The 2020 election resulted in a majority for the Labour Party, winning 65 seats, allowing them to continue the Sixth Labour Government unrestricted. Their coalition partner from the 52nd Parliament, New Zealand First, did not receive enough votes to pass the five percent threshold or win in an electorate, kicking them out of Parliament. Confidence and supply partner the Green Party received 10 seats, up two, becoming the first minor party ever to increase their share of the vote following their being in government. In the opposition, the National Party lost 23 seats, giving them a total of 33, and ACT New Zealand went from one seat to ten. The Māori Party won the Waiariki electorate and gained an additional list seat after losing representation in the 2017 general election.

Government formation 

Labour achieved a majority in the 2020 election, allowing them to form a government without any coalition agreements having to be made. However, Prime Minister Jacinda Ardern entered talks with the Green Party about "potential areas of co-operation" in the formation of the new government. After two weeks of discussions, the Green Party reached an agreement with Labour on 31 October to become part of the next Government, with co-leaders James Shaw and Marama Davidson receiving ministerial positions outside of cabinet. Shaw remained Minister for Climate Change and become Associate Minister for the Environment, while Davidson became Minister for the Prevention of Family and Sexual Violence and Associate Minister of Housing. The new government was sworn in on 6 November 2020. Some ministerial positions changed in July 2021. Ardern was succeeded as prime minister by Chris Hipkins on 25 January 2023, following her resignation.

Parliamentary term
The writ for the 2020 election was returned on 20 November 2020 after being delayed from its original set date of 12 November due to election recounts. Under section 19 of Constitution Act 1986, Parliament must meet no later than six weeks after this date; on 6 November 2020, following the new government's first Cabinet meeting, Prime Minister Jacinda Ardern confirmed that the Commission Opening and State Opening of Parliament would take place on 25 and 26 November 2020, respectively.

The 53rd Parliament is the first parliament since the 44th New Zealand Parliament (and the introduction of an MMP electoral system) to have a single party hold an outright majority of seats. The Labour Party currently holds 64 seats, 3 more than the required 61 seats needed for a majority.

Timeline 
1 November 2020 – The Green Party enter into a "cooperation agreement" with Labour
6 November 2020 –
Jacinda Ardern is sworn in for a second term as Prime Minister. Other ministers are also sworn in.
Final results of the 2020 election are released. Three electorates flip to Labour, and National lose two seats on the party vote, with Labour and the Māori Party picking up one each.
Gerry Brownlee resigns as Deputy Leader of the National Party.
10 November 2020 – Shane Reti is elected Deputy Leader of the National Party.
20 November 2020 – The writ of the election is returned (having been delayed from 12 November due to a judicial recount).
25 November 2020 – Commission Opening of Parliament
26 November 2020 – State Opening of Parliament
20 May 2021 – Budget 2021 was delivered to Parliament.
25 November 2021 – Judith Collins is removed as Leader of the National Party by a caucus vote of no confidence.
30 November 2021 – Christopher Luxon and Nicola Willis are elected Leader and Deputy Leader of the National Party.
20 May 2022 – Budget 2022 was delivered to Parliament.
18 June 2022 – Tauranga by-election.
10 December 2022 – Hamilton West by-election.
19 January 2023 – Jacinda Ardern announces resignation.
23 January 2023 – Chris Hipkins is elected Leader of the Labour Party.
25 January 2023 – Chris Hipkins and Carmel Sepuloni are sworn in as Prime Minister and Deputy Prime Minister.

Major legislation 

On 1 March 2021, the Local Electoral (Māori Wards and Māori Constituencies) Amendment Act 2021 received royal assent after being introduced by Nanaia Mahuta on 9 February. This Act eliminates mechanisms for holding public referendums on the establishment of Māori wards and constituencies on local bodies, which allowed the public to veto a council's decision to introduce a Māori ward.

Workplace culture
In 2019, following allegations of workplace misconduct by Meka Whaitiri, Jami-Lee Ross, and Maggie Barry in the 52nd Parliament the Speaker of the House Trevor Mallard commissioned a review into bullying and harassment in Parliament.

In the 53rd Parliament, Parliamentary Services started to implement the 85 recommendations from the review into workplace culture. Despite this, allegations of workplace misconduct continued. These allegations include:

 Nick Smith bullying his staff, with allegations from 2020 leading to his resignation in 2021. 
 Gaurav Sharma being bullied by the Labour Whips office, the Prime Minister's office, and by Parliamentary Services.
 Anna Lorck bullying her staff.

Dissolution
Under section 17 of the Constitution Act 1986, Parliament expires a maximum of three years "from the day fixed for the return of the writs issued for the last preceding general election of members of the House of Representatives, and no longer". The writs were issued on 13 September 2020 and were returned on 20 November 2020, meaning that the 53rd Parliament must dissolve on or before 20 November 2023. The 2023 general election is scheduled to be held on 14 October and the 53rd Parliament is scheduled to be dissolved on 8 September.

Officeholders

Presiding officers
 Speaker of the House:
 Rt. Hon. Adrian Rurawhe (Labour) from 24 August 2022
 Rt. Hon. Trevor Mallard (Labour) until 24 August 2022
 Deputy Speaker of the House:
 Greg O'Connor (Labour) from 25 August 2022
 Adrian Rurawhe (Labour) until 24 August 2022
 Assistant Speaker of the House: Hon. Jenny Salesa (Labour)
 Assistant Speaker of the House: Hon. Jacqui Dean (National)
 Assistant Speaker of the House: Ian McKelvie (National) from 1 March 2022

Other parliamentary officers
 Clerk: David Wilson
 Deputy Clerk: Suze Jones
 Serjeant-at-Arms: Steve Streefkerk

Party leaders
 Prime Minister of New Zealand (Labour):
 Rt. Hon. Chris Hipkins from 25 January 2023
 Rt. Hon. Jacinda Ardern until 25 January 2023
 Deputy Leader of the Labour Party: Hon. Kelvin Davis
 Deputy Prime Minister of New Zealand:
 Hon. Carmel Sepuloni from 25 January 2023
 Hon. Grant Robertson until 25 January 2023
 Leader of the Opposition (National):
Christopher Luxon from 30 November 2021
Hon. Judith Collins until 25 November 2021
 Deputy Leader of the Opposition (National):
Nicola Willis from 30 November 2021
Shane Reti from until 30 November 2021
 Co-leaders of the Green Party of Aotearoa New Zealand:
 Female Co-leader: Hon. Marama Davidson
 Male Co-leader: Hon. James Shaw (except between 25 July and 10 September 2022)
 Leader of ACT New Zealand: David Seymour
 Deputy Leader of ACT New Zealand: Brooke van Velden
 Co-leaders of the Māori Party:
 Female Co-leader: Debbie Ngarewa-Packer
 Male Co-leader: Rawiri Waititi

Floor leaders
 Leader of the House: 
 Hon. Grant Robertson from 25 January 2023
 Hon. Chris Hipkins until 25 January 2023
 Deputy Leader of the House: 
 Hon. Kieran McAnulty from 14 June 2022
 Hon. Michael Wood until 14 June 2022
 Shadow Leader of the House:
 Chris Bishop from  16 July 2020 to 27 August 2021 and from 6 December 2021 to 19 January 2023
 Hon. Michael Woodhouse from 28 August 2021 to 6 December 2021 and from 19 January 2023
 Deputy Shadow Leader of the House:
 Hon. Michael Woodhouse until 28 August 2021 and from 6 December 2021 to 19 January 2023
 Simeon Brown from 28 August 2021 to 6 December 2021 and from 19 January 2023

Whips

 Senior Government (Labour) Whip: 
 Tangi Utikere from 31 January 2023
 Duncan Webb from 14 June 2022 until 31 January 2023
 Kieran McAnulty until 14 June 2022
 Junior Government (Labour) Whips:
 Camilla Belich from 31 January 2023
 Shanan Halbert from 31 January 2023
 Tracey McLellan from 31 January 2023
 Barbara Edmonds until 31 January 2023
 Willow-Jean Prime until 31 January 2023
 Tangi Utikere from 14 June 2022 until 31 January 2023
 Duncan Webb until 14 June 2022
 Senior Opposition (National) Whip:
 Chris Penk from 7 December 2021
 Matt Doocey until 7 December 2021
 Junior Opposition Whip: Maureen Pugh
 Green Party Whip (Musterer): Jan Logie
 Green Party Deputy Musterer: Elizabeth Kerekere
 ACT New Zealand Whip: Brooke van Velden
 Māori Party Whip (Matarau): Debbie Ngarewa-Packer

Shadow cabinets
 Opposition Cabinet of Christopher Luxon during the 53rd Parliament from 30 November 2021
 Opposition Cabinet of Judith Collins during the 53rd Parliament from 11 November 2020 to 25 November 2021

Members
The table below shows the members of the 53rd Parliament based on the results of the 2020 general election. Ministerial roles were officially announced on 2 November 2020. Based on preliminary results, there were 40 new MPs. When final results were announced on 6 November, this rose to 42 new members. Labour lost a member on 23 August 2022 due to the expulsion of Gaurav Sharma from the parliamentary party. After Sharma's resignation from parliament, the December 2022 by-election for his Hamilton West electorate was won by National.

Overview

This table shows the number of MPs in each party:

Notes
 The Green Party entered into a cooperation agreement with the Labour Party on 1 November 2020 in which they agreed not to oppose confidence and supply. This differs from a confidence and supply agreement that has been a feature of New Zealand governments, in which minor political parties agree to explicitly support confidence and supply.
The Working Government majority is calculated as all Government MPs less all opposition parties. It excludes the Green Party which can either support or abstain from confidence and supply. The Working Government with Cooperation majority includes the Green Party.

Members

Demographics of elected MPs
The 2020 general election saw the election of New Zealand's first African MP (Ibrahim Omer), first Sri Lankan-born MP (Vanushi Walters) and first Latin American MP (Ricardo Menéndez March). Six new LGBT+ MPs were elected (Menéndez March, Glen Bennett, Ayesha Verrall, Shanan Halbert, Elizabeth Kerekere, Tangi Utikere), making the New Zealand House of Representatives the national parliament with the highest percentage of LGBT+ members in the world.

Changes 
The following changes in Members of Parliament occurred during the term of the 53rd Parliament:

Seating plan

Start of term 
The chamber is in a horseshoe-shape.

Current seating plan 
.

Committees

The 53rd Parliament has 12 select committees and 8 specialist committees. They are listed below, with their chairpersons and deputy chairpersons:

Electorates

This section shows the New Zealand electorates as they are currently represented in the 53rd Parliament. Electorates were redrawn after the 2018 census and will remain the same for the 2023 election.

General electorates

Māori electorates

See also 
Opinion polling for the 2020 New Zealand general election
Politics of New Zealand

Notes

References 

New Zealand parliaments
2020 elections in New Zealand
Lists of political office-holders in New Zealand
New Zealand